Clifford Leofric Purdy "Jim" Bishop was the Suffragan Bishop of Malmesbury from 1962 until 1973 in the Church of England.

Life
He was born on 11 June 1908 and educated at St. John's School, Leatherhead and Christ's College, Cambridge. Ordained  in 1933 and later Vicar of St George's, Camberwell, he was also Rural Dean of  Walsingham and then Wearmouth until his ordination to the episcopate. He died on 1 September 1994.

References

1908 births
People educated at St John's School, Leatherhead
Alumni of Christ's College, Cambridge
20th-century Church of England bishops
Bishops of Swindon (previously Malmesbury)
1994 deaths